Jacopo Fazzini (born 16 March 2003) is an Italian footballer who plays as midfielder for  club Empoli.

Career 
Fazzini grewed up with Viareggio, Capezzano and Empoli. Fazzini won in the 2020–21 the league with the under-19s team. Fazzini made his debut on 19 January 2022, in a 3–2 Coppa Italia defeat against Inter after extra-time coming on as substitute in the 97th minute.

Personal life 
Fazzini's grandfather, Giorgio was a tennis player. His brother, Tommaso is a beach soccer player.

Career statistics

References

External links 
 

2003 births
Living people
Italian footballers
Association football midfielders
Empoli F.C. players